Tirma are a surmic ethnic group in Ethiopia and in Sudan. They speak Suri. The population of this group is numbered in the tens of thousands.

References
Tirma Joshua Project

Ethnic groups in Ethiopia
Ethnic groups in South Sudan